Bessie Ayers Moody-Lawrence (February 14, 1941 – December 18, 2012) was an American politician.

Born in Chester County, South Carolina, Moody-Lawrence taught at Winthrop University. Moody-Lawrence then served in the South Carolina House of Representatives as a Democrat from 1993 to 2007 in York County, South Carolina. Moody-Lawrence died at her home in Rock Hill, South Carolina from brain cancer.

Notes

1941 births
2012 deaths
People from Rock Hill, South Carolina
People from Chester County, South Carolina
Winthrop University faculty
Women state legislators in South Carolina
Democratic Party members of the South Carolina House of Representatives
American women academics
21st-century American women